Acer pentapomicum, the Punjab maple, is a species of flowering plant in the genus Acer, native to Afghanistan, Pakistan, Central Asia and the western Himalaya. Preferring to grow 1,900 to 2,800 m above sea level, it is a member of the upper canopy in forested areas where it is found.

References

pentapomicum
Plants described in 1874